John B. Kirkham (26 February 1869 – 30 November 1930) (one source states Kirkham was born on 26 February 1868), known as Johnny Kirkham, was an English footballer who played in The Football League for Accrington. 
He signed in 1883 for his local club Hapton F.C.

In 1884 Kirkham signed for  Oswaldtwistle Rovers and played for them for three seasons, 1884-87. In the 1885-86 season Oswaldtwistle Rovers reached the 2nd Round of the FA Cup for the only time. It is not recorded if Kirkham played in the FA Cup games.

In 1887 Kirkham signed for Padiham. Padiham was formed in 1878 and were well supported. But being a small town the club could not compete when Football became professional (See Wikipedia article on Padiham F.C.).

Season 1888-89

Jack Kirkham made his League debut on 8 September 1888 at Anfield, then home of Everton. Accrington lost the match 2–1. When he made his League debut he was 19 years 195 days old; that made him, on that first day of League football, Accrington's youngest player. Jack Kirkham played 19 League matches and scored 12 goals in season 1888–89. Kirkham top scored for Accrington. As a forward he played in a forward line that scored 3 goals or more on five occasions. He scored 2 in a match on 3 occasions that season. His debut league goal and first brace was scored on 15 September 1888 at Leamington Road, Blackburn. Accrington drew the match 5–5 with Blackburn Rovers.
He spent five years at Accrington until their demise in 1893.

Sesaon 1889-90 

Season 1889-90 was Accrington' most successful ever in its short time as a member of The Football League, finishing sixth. Johnny Kirkham was an ever-present that season playing in every League match. The only other Accrington player to be ever present was John McLennan. The only match Kirkham missed was the FA Cup replay against  West Bromwich Albion. Kirkham was not as effective in front of goal as in 1888-89 scoring only five League goals. He played as an Inside-Forward and on both wings.

Statistics
Source:

 Test Match vs Sheffield United at Town Ground, Nottingham on 22 April 1893. Accrington lost 0-1

References

English footballers
Oswaldtwistle Rovers F.C. players
Padiham F.C. players
Accrington F.C. players
English Football League players
1869 births
1930 deaths
Association football forwards